UKSCblog (The United Kingdom Supreme Court blog) is a law blog dedicated to the Supreme Court of the United Kingdom. The blog is based on the SCOTUSblog in the US which provides commentary and information about the United States Supreme Court.

The establishment of the Supreme Court marks an important constitutional change for the UK, and to mark this development, the UKSC Blog has been set up to provide commentary on the court and its judgments.

History
UKSCblog was created by, amongst others, Hugh Tomlinson QC of Matrix Chambers and Dan Tench, Head of Judicial Review and Public Law at law firm Olswang.

Following the blog's launch on 1 October 2009, The Times called it an "exciting development", while the BBC noted that "one group of influential solicitors and barristers is launching a blog to monitor the Supreme Court's decision making". City AM has also commented on the blog.

References

External links
UKSCblog
General Blog

Law blogs
British legal websites
Supreme Court of the United Kingdom
2009 establishments in the United Kingdom
Internet properties established in 2009